Ask Me to Dance is a studio album by American Christian and country singer Cristy Lane. It was released in March 1980 via United Artists and LS Records and contained 11 tracks. It was the fifth studio album release of Lane's music career and her most commercially-successful, reaching the top 20 of the American country albums chart. Ask Me to Dance included Lane's signature and only number one single, "One Day at a Time". The album received positive reviews from critics following its release.

Background and content
During the late 1970s Cristy Lane had several years of major commercial success as a country music artist. She had top ten hit singles with songs like "Let Me Down Easy" and "I Just Can't Stay Married to You", in addition to an accolade from the Academy of Country Music Awards. In 1980, Lane reached her commercial zenith with the Christian song, "One Day at a Time". The song's success as a country hit inspired the release of Ask Me to Dance. 

The album contained a collection of 11 tracks, including the up-tempo title track and "I Knew the Mason". The disc's remaining songs were mostly "pop ballads", according to Greg Adams of AllMusic, highlighting Lane's cover of "Danny Boy" as an example. "One Day at a Time" was the project's only non-secular track and was penned by Kris Kristofferson. Ask Me to Dance was recorded at LSI Studios, beginning in 1979. Production for the project finished in January 1980 at the same studio. It was produced by songwriter Jerry Gillespie, who had previously composed tracks Lane had recorded for prior album releases.

Release and reception

Ask Me to Dance was released in March 1980 on United Artists Records and LS Records. It was Lane's fifth studio album released in her career and second issued with United Artists. The album was originally distributed as a vinyl LP and a cassette. The disc became Lane's third to reach a peak position on the Billboard country albums chart, reaching number 14. It was Lane's highest-peaking album on the chart. Ask Me to Dance received a positive review from AllMusic's Greg Adams, gave it four out of five stars. Adams compared Lane's music style to that of Lynn Anderson due to her "innocuous, broadly-appealing variety of country [that] would have made her a Lawrence Welk Show favorite." Adams also praised Lane's "well-enunciated" vocal style and the record's "slick pop production".

Ask Me to Dance included two single releases. Prior to the album's release, "One Day a Time" was issued as a single via United Artists Records in March 1980. The song became Lane's first (and only) single to peak at number one on the Billboard Hot Country Songs chart. In addition, the single reached number ten on the RPM Country Songs survey in Canada. In August 1980, "Sweet Sexy Eyes" was spawned as the disc's second single via United Artists Records. The song was titled "Sexy Eyes" on the LP's original track listing. It reached number eight on the Billboard country songs chart, becoming her final top ten single there. In Canada, the single peaked at number 16 on the RPM country chart, becoming her final top 20 single there.

Track listing

Personnel
All credits are adapted from the liner notes of Ask Me to Dance.

Musical personnel

 Charlie Black – Rhythm guitar
 Jerry Carrigan – Drums
 Buddy Harman – Drums
 Jerry Gillespie – Lead vocals
 Jon Goin – Electric guitar
 Jim Greene – Background vocals
 Sheri Kramer – Background vocals
 Sheridan Kurland Strings – Strings
 Cristy Lane – Lead vocals
 Mike Lawler – Synthesizer bass
 Anne Marine – Background vocals

 Terry McMillan – Harmonica
 Jack Miller – Background vocals
 Bob Moore – Bass
 Fred Newell – Electric guitar
 Ron Oates – Piano
 Bobby Ogdin – Piano
 Steve Schaeffer – Bass
 Dan Sheffield – Trumpet
 Lisa Silver – Background vocals
 Diane Tidwell – Background vocals
 Jim Well – Background vocals

Technical personnel
 Norma Gerson – Make-up
 Jerry Gillespie – Producer
 Steve Moser – Engineer
 Ron Oates – Arranger
 Danny Purcell – Mastering
 Lee Stoller – Management
 Bergen White – Arranger

Charts

Release history

References

1980 albums
Albums produced by Jerry Gillespie
Cristy Lane albums
LS Records albums
United Artists Records albums